Sonar is a Belgian musical group. Sonar combines power noise, techno, and industrial music.

Sonar was formed as a side-project of noise artist Dirk Ivens in 1996. At first, Ivens employed the help of Patrick Stevens.  Later, Eric Van Wonterghem, who had worked with Ivens in Absolute Body Control, joined Ivens as the second member of Sonar.

Sonar toured in Europe with Canadian music project Decoded Feedback in 2001.

Discography

Music festivals

Sonar performed at:

 Infest, United Kingdom (2002, 2011)
 Kinetik, Canada (2008)
 Maschinenfest, Germany (2001, 2003, 2005, 2007, 2008, 2010, 2012, 2014)
 M'era Luna, Germany (2002)

References

Belgian industrial music groups
Noise musical groups
Musical groups established in 1996